"Tarana-e-Milli" or "Anthem of the Community" is an enthusiastic poem in which Allama Mohammad Iqbal paid tribute to the Muslim Ummah (nation) and said that Islam is the religion of the world. He recognized all Muslims anywhere in the world as part of a single nation,  whose leader is Muhammad, the prophet of the Muslims.

Iqbal wrote the poem a few years after writing a poem written in the same meter and rhyme scheme call Tarana-e-Hindi (More commonly known as Sare Jahan Se Accha). In this time, Iqbal's world view had changed dramatically, Tarana-E-Hindi is a patriotic song that glorifies the land of Hindustan or Undivided India (Modern day comprising India, Pakistan and Bangladesh) and the people who live in it; it also suggests that people should not divided by religion and should instead be bonded by a common national identity. "Tarana-E-Milli", on the other hand, argues that a global, Islamic community should come above all and even warns against a nationalistic world view. This reflects the dramatic change in Iqbal's views, and his support for the Muslim League and the Pakistan Movement.

Poem

Urdu text

Roman Transliteration

Chin o Arab hamaraa hindostaaN hamaara

Muslim hain hum; watan hai saara jahaaN hamaara

tawheed ki amaanat seenoN meiN hai hamaarey

aasaaN naheeN miTaana naam o nishaaN hamaara

dunyaN ke but-kadoN meiN pahlaa who ghar KHUDA kaa

hum uskey paasbaaN haiN who paasbaaN hamaara

tayghon key saaye meiN hum, pal kar jawaaN huwey haiN

khanjar hilaal kaa hai qawmi nishaaN hamaara

maghrib ki waadiyoN meiN guunji azaaN hamaari

thamata na thaa kisee se sayl rawaaN hamaara

baatil se dabney waaley ay aasmaaN nahiN hum

sau baar kar chukaa hai tu imtihaaN hamaara

ay gulsitaan e andalus! who din haiN yaad tujh ko

thaa teri DaaliyoN par jab aashiyaaN hamaara

ay mawjey dajlah! tu bhi pahchaanti hai hum ko

ab tak hai tera daryaa afsaana khwaaN hamaara

ay arz e paak! teri hurmat pey kaT marey hum

hai khooN teri ragoN meiN ab tak rawaaN hamaara

saalaar e kaarwaaN hai Mir e Hijaz apnaa

is naam se hai baaqi aaraam e jaaN hamaara

Iqbal kaa taraana baang e daraa hai goyaa

hotaa hai jaadah paymaa phir kaarwaaN hamaara

English Translation

Central Asia (Although in modern Urdu Chin means China, Chin referred to Central Asia in Iqbal's time) is ours, Arabia is ours, India is ours

We are Muslims and the whole world is ours

The treasure of tawhid is in our hearts,

It is not easy to wipe out our name and mark.

The first house we have liberated from idols is the Ka'abah;

We are its custodians, and It is our protector

We have grown up in the shadows of swords,

Our mascot is the crescent shaped dagger

Our prayer calls have reverberated in the valleys of the west,

The force of our flow could not be stopped by anyone

O the skies! we will not be subdued by falsehood,

You have tried (our steadfasteness) a hundred times!

O, the garden of Andalusia! do you remember those days -

When our abode was the nest on your branches?

O, the waves of Tigris! surely, you recognize us -

Your river tells our tales even to this day

O, the pure soil of Makkah! we have bled and died for your honor,

Our blood flows in your veins until now

The leader of our caravan, is the Prince of Hijaz (Muhammad)

It is his name that keeps our heart in comfort and peace.

Iqbal's song is a clarion call

For the caravan to rise and continue the journey once more

See also 
 Index of Muhammad Iqbal–related articles
Muhammad Iqbal
Pakistan

References

External links
Text of Tara-e-Milli in Urdu, with an introductory explanation in English.
 Discussion on Iqbal's nationalism.

Poetry by Muhammad Iqbal
Urdu-language words and phrases